Frontolysis in meteorology, is the dissipation or weakening of an atmospheric front.

In contrary to areas of "Frontogenesis", the areas where air masses diverge are called areas of frontolysis.

See also
Frontogenesis
Outflow boundary

References

Synoptic meteorology and weather